Valentin Dzhonev (20 June 1952 – 12 September 2015) was a Bulgarian athlete. He competed in the men's javelin throw at the 1976 Summer Olympics.

References

External links
 

1952 births
2015 deaths
Athletes (track and field) at the 1976 Summer Olympics
Bulgarian male javelin throwers
Olympic athletes of Bulgaria
Universiade bronze medalists for Bulgaria
Universiade medalists in athletics (track and field)
Medalists at the 1977 Summer Universiade
People from Kyustendil
Sportspeople from Kyustendil Province
21st-century Bulgarian people
20th-century Bulgarian people